Kitasato may refer to
Kitasato Shibasaburō (1853–1931), Japanese physician 
Kitasato University in Tokyo, Japan named after Kitasato
Kitasato-Daigaku-mae Station in Towada, Aomori Prefecture, Japan